Rae Anne "Raeanne" Rubenstein (September 15, 1945 – 	November 30, 2019) was an American portrait photographer. She was best known for her photographs from the late 1960s art rock scene and subsequently for her photographs of the country music scene.

Early life and education 
She was born on September 15, 1945 on Staten Island, and her father, Isidore, owned the Tudor Furniture Company, and her mother, Sylvia (Grossman) Rubenstein, taught elementary school. She attended Curtis High School before moving to the Annenberg School of Communication at the University of Pennsylvania, graduating in 1967.

Career 
Rubenstein started her photography career by providing complimentary portraits for the celebrity interviews of her journalist friend Lita Eliscu. This resulted in her introduction to Andy Warhol, who she regularly photographed throughout the 1960s and who also introduced her to many celebrities at his Factory venue. Bonnie Garner arranged for her to have access to the Fillmore East, where she documented many rock acts including Jimi Hendrix, Janis Joplin, Jim Morrison, John Lennon, Yoko Ono, Lou Reed, Pink Floyd and Joe Cocker.

A trip to Nashville in 1975 resulted in a love affair with the personalities of country music, producing a large body of work on celebrities like Lynn Anderson, Johnny Cash, Tammy Wynette, Waylon Jennings and Willie Nelson. This content provided material for multiple books and exhibitions.

She enrolled in 2009 in Watkins Film School and subsequently produced, directed and photographed short movies. Rubenstein died on November 30, 2019 in Nashville, Tennessee.

Bibliography 

 Honkytonk heroes: A photo album of country music, published by Harper & Row (hardcover 154 pages, 1975)
 Gone Country: Portraits of New Country Music's Stars, published by Schirmer Trade Books (hardcover 200 pages, 1997)

References 

American portrait photographers
20th-century American photographers
21st-century American photographers
Fashion photographers
Photographers from New York City
1945 births
2019 deaths
20th-century American women photographers
21st-century American women photographers